InVogue Records is an American record company based in Findlay, Ohio. It was founded by Nick Moore, lead singer of Before Their Eyes, in 2009.  In the fall of 2011 InVogue Records signed a distribution deal with Independent Label Group (owned by Warner Music Group) and Alternative Distribution Alliance. In the summer of 2017 InVogue signed a new distribution deal with Sony/RED. The deal was merged into The Orchard/Sony.

Current artists 
 Boys of Fall
 Discrepancies 
 Dead Bundy
 Dreamhouse
 Go For Gold
 Healer 
 Heart To Heart 
 He Is We
 In Her Own Words
 Mouth Culture
 Patternist
 Qualia
 Saiah 
 Stain The Canvas
 Until We Get Caught
 Widmore

Past artists

Active
 Ashland (Unsigned)
 Assuming We Survive 
 Before Their Eyes 
 Being As An Ocean (Unsigned)
 Convictions
 Courage My Love
 Chase Huglin
 Chunk! No, Captain Chunk! (Fearless Records)
 Clover The Girl 
 Dayseeker (Spinefarm Records)
 Everyone Dies in Utah (Unsigned)
 Famous Last Words (SBG Records)
 FFN
 Floods 
 For All I Am 
 Ghost Key
 Glass Houses
 Hawthorne Heights (Pure Noise Records)
 Hazing (Unsigned)
 Heavy Things (Unsigned)
 Kingdom of Giants (SharpTone Records)
 Makari
 Mark Rose (Unsigned)
 Motives (Smartpunk Records)
 Normandie (Easy Life Records)
 Patient Sixty-Seven (Unsigned)
 The Parallel
 The Plot In You (Fearless Records)
 Punchline
 Restless Streets (Unsigned)
 September Stories (Unsigned)
 Secret Eyes (Unsigned)
 Shreddy Krueger (Unsigned)
 Sienna Skies (Unsigned)
 Smash Into Pieces (Unsigned)
Whether, I (Reunited)
 Woven In Hiatus
 Young Thieves

Disbanded
 Akissforjersey (Inactive)
 Another Hero Dies
 As Artifacts
 The Bad Chapter (Inactive since Dec 2017)
 Belle Histoire 
 Bullets and Belvedere
Challenger!
 City Lights
 Castle No Kings
 Conspire
 Dependence (Inactive)
 Follow My Lead
 From Atlantis
 Get Up Texas
 Helia (Hiatus)
Hotel Books
 Idlehands
 InDirections (Now known as Closure)
 In League (Inactive)
 JT Woodruff (Inactive)
 LEAV/E/ARTH (Inactive)
 Legacy 
 Let It Happen 
 Liferuiner (Inactive)
 Mirror Eyes (Now known as Floods)
 Royal
 Sleep City
 Spies Like Us
 That's Outrageous!
 The Illumination
 Until We Are Ghosts (Inactive)
 Worthwhile 
 5 Years & Counting

InVogue Records Tours
In the summer of 2014, InVogue Records announced the inaugural InVogue Records Tour, in partnership with MerchNow, featuring Famous Last Words, Whether I, For All I Am, and Until We Are Ghosts. The tour wrapped around the midwest (where the label is based), as well as dates on the east coast. 
In the fall of 2015, Nick Moore announced on Twitter that Hotel Books would be embarking on the next InVogue Tour. In the fall of that year, Hotel Books announced the "Run Wild, Young Beauty" tour, named after their debut full-length album. Due to the album-branded title, and the package's addition of Tragic Hero Records band Bad Luck, it was unclear if this tour was truly the annual InVogue Records Tour. Hotel Books took out label mates Motives and Until We Are Ghosts on this tour as well.

Spring 2016 came the official announcement of a proper InVogue Records Tour featuring Hotel Books. The tour was co-headlined by Dayseeker, and included Convictions as support. This tour hit the west coast, midwest and east coast, but the first date, in San Diego, CA, was without Hotel Books due to their vocalist, Cam Smith, having a concussion.  An east coast InVogue Records Tour took place in the fall featuring Convictions, Everyone Dies in Utah, Glass Houses and Conspire. The fall edition of the tour also included a stop at So What?! Music Festival in Dallas, Texas.

In the winter of 2016, Cam Smith announced on his Twitter that Hotel Books would be taking the InVogue Records Tour to Europe, and "to other exciting places." The tweet was followed by an official announcement three days later. InVogue Records announced a European edition of the IVR Tour featuring Hotel Books and Convictions. Two weeks later, a Japanese IVR Tour was announced as well, featuring the same two bands. The tour also included two exclusive dates in Russia.

In January 2017, the label launched the first ever InVogue Records Unplugged Tour, featuring JT Woodruff (of Hawthorne Heights), In Her Own Words, Hazing and Woven in Hiatus. The tour featured a round-robin style performance and went from the west coast to the midwest.

In the summer of 2018, InVogue Records announced another InVogue Records Tour featuring Boys of Fall, In Her Own Words and Ky Rodgers.

Compilation albums
 Happy Holidays, I Miss You (Released: November 25, 2016)

See also 
 List of record labels
 Nick Moore

References

External links 
 

American record labels